is a 1943 Japanese martial arts drama film and the directorial debut of the Japanese film director Akira Kurosawa. First released in Japan on 25 March 1943 by Toho film studios, the film was eventually released in the United States on 28 April 1974. The film is based on the novel of the same name written by Tsuneo Tomita, the son of prominent judoka Tsunejirō Tomita. It follows the story of Sanshiro, a talented though willful youth, who travels to the city in order to learn Jujutsu. However, upon his arrival he discovers a new form of self-defence: Judo. The main character is based on Saigō Shirō.

The film is seen as an early example of Kurosawa's immediate grasp of the film-making process, and includes many of his directorial trademarks, such as the use of wipes, weather patterns as reflections of character moods, and abruptly changing camera speeds. The film itself was quite influential at the time, and has been remade on no fewer than five occasions. It spawned a sequel, Sanshiro Sugata Part II, which was released in 1945 and also directed by Kurosawa.

Plot
In 1883, Sanshiro is a talented though willful youth who wishes to become a jujutsu master by becoming a student at one of the city's martial arts schools. His first attempts to find a suitable instructor fail, until he finally finds an accomplished master, Shogoro Yano from the Shudokan Judo school, who he sees defending himself against a group of jujutsu bullies near a river. Initially, Sanshiro is physically capable, but he lacks any type of poise or reflection concerning his self-control and demeanor, even getting into merry fights at a village festival. His master believes him to be talented but lacking in discipline, describing teaching him judo as "like giving a knife to a madman". After being told about his lack of care about life, Sanshiro jumps into a lotus pond to prove his strength and loyalty. Clinging to a stake in the pond, he stays the whole day and night before he sees the opening of a lotus bottom that makes him find self-realization. Leaping out of the pond, he goes to Yano to ask for his forgiveness. He starts to appreciate that there is more to his life and to his art than simple muscle and brawl and soon becomes a leading student in his school.

The city is looking to employ one of the local martial arts schools to guide the training of its local police force, and the school of Sanshiro becomes a leading candidate along with its rival, the local school of Ryōi Shintō-ryū jujutsu led by Hansuke Murai. He first faces Kodama, a jujutsu tough that had tried to take out Shogoro in the river. The ensuing match leads to the death of Kodama after a move by Sanshiro leaves him crashing into a corner. In a scheduled competition between the two schools, Sanshiro is chosen to represent his school in a public match against Murai himself to determine which school is best to train the local police in the martial arts. The scheduled bout gets off to a slow start, but Sanshiro soon comes into his own and begins executing devastating throws which cause internal physical damage to his opponent. Although Murai tries to stand every time, energized by the memory of his daughter Sayo, he is forced to give up after the third time he is violently sent to the ground by Sanshiro.

After the match, Sanshiro makes friends with his defeated opponent and is attracted to Sayo. Sayo is a local beauty, and another Ryōi Shintō-ryū jujutsu master, Higaki, competes with Sanshiro for her affections. When he challenges Sanshiro to a duel to the death, Sanshiro accepts and defeats him by inflicting permanent crippling damage to Higaki. After emerging victorious from his duel, Sanshiro prepares for his next assignment in Yokohama while being escorted on the local train by Sayo. He promises to return to her after he finishes his journey.

Cast

Susumu Fujita as Sanshiro Sugata
Denjirō Ōkōchi as Shōgorō Yano
Yukiko Todoroki as Sayo Murai
Ryūnosuke Tsukigata as Gennosuke Higaki
Takashi Shimura as Hansuke Murai
Ranko Hanai as Osumi Kodana
Sugisaku Aoyama as Tsunetami Iimura
Ichiro Sugai as Police Chief Michitsune Mishima
Yoshio Kosugi as Master Saburō Kodama
Kokuten Kōdō as Buddhist Priest
Michisaburō Segawa as Wada
Akitake Kōno as Yoshima Dan
Shōji Kiyokawa as Yūjirō Toda
Kunio Mita as Kōhei Tsuzaki
Akira Nakamura as Toranosuki Niiseki
Eisaburō Sakauchi as Nemeto
Hajime Hikari as Torakichi

Production
Following five years of second unit director work on films such as Uma and Roppa's Honeymoon, Kurosawa was finally given the go-ahead to direct his first film, even though he himself claimed that, in films like Uma, "I had been so much in charge of production I had felt like the director". After hearing of a new novel from the writer Tomita Tsuneo in an advertisement, Kurosawa decided the project was for him and asked film producer Iwao Mori to buy the rights for him. Kurosawa, told that Toho wouldn't be able to buy the rights until it was published, eagerly awaited its release, to the point where he stalked bookstores night and day until he found a copy; he quickly read the book and wrote an screenplay for it. Despite his enthusiasm, Masahiro Makino was first asked to direct, but he declined.

According to Japanese cinema scholar Donald Richie, the reason Kurosawa was allowed to direct the film was because he had had two film scripts printed, including one of which had won the education minister's prize. However, his work was too far away from the government requirements for a wartime film. Tomita's novel, on the other hand, was considered "safe", dealing, as it did, with a Japanese subject such as the martial rivalry between judo and jujitsu; being a period piece; and having a popular subject. Kurosawa deliberately went out to make a "movie-like movie", as he knew he would not be able to insert any particularly didactic qualities in the film.

When he went to the board of censors (which he likened to being on trial), the film passed on the basis of recommendation by Yasujiro Ozu, who called it an important artistic achievement despite other voices claiming it was too "British-American". After the initial release, Japanese censors reportedly trimmed the film by 17 minutes. Some of this footage was later recovered and added to a DVD release, and the original script with the missing material still exists; intertitles are included in the release that describe what occurred in the missing parts. The 1952 re-release (from which the 2009 Criterion DVD is made) opens with (translated from the original Japanese text):  

Paul Anderer emphasized Kurosawa's attention to the character of Gennosuke Higaki in the film. Higaki, created by Tsuneo Tomita for the novel and inspired by real life jujutsu master Mataemon Tanabe, is the film's central villain. Anderer stated:

Themes
The central theme of the film is the education and initiation of Sugata and the way in which, whilst learning the ways of Judo, he also learns about himself. The film's central scene concerning this theme is when, after being accosted by Yano for getting involved in a streetfight, Sugata leaps into the cold waters near Yano's temple and stays there in order to show his master his dedication, and the fact that he is neither afraid to live nor to die. However, the resident monk chides him for this self-serving display, and he emerges from the pond a humbler man after witnessing the blooming of a lotus blossom, a Buddhist symbol of purity.

Remakes

Films
Sanshiro Sugata has been remade five times since it was initially released, although these versions are even harder to find in the west than the original. The 1955 and 1965 versions share the script of the original versions, whereas the subsequent three releases are all based on the novel rather than Kurosawa's screenplay.
 Sugata Sanshirō (1955) - Directed by Shigeo Tanaka
 Sugata Sanshirō (1965) - Directed by Seiichirō Uchikawa
 Ninkyō Yawara Ichidai (1966) - Directed by Sadao Nakajima
 Sugata Sanshirō (1970) - Directed by Kunio Watanabe
 Sugata Sanshirō (1977) - Directed by Kihachi Okamoto

Television
 Sugata Sanshirō (1970) was aired on NTV, started by Muga Takewaki.
 Sugata Sanshirō (1978-79) was aired on NTV, started by Hiroshi Katsuno and Masaya Oki.

See also
List of incomplete or partially lost films
Segata Sanshiro

References

External links

 
 
 Sanshiro Sugata  at the Japanese Movie Database
 "Sanshiro Sugata": Kurosawa's Elegy for the Reluctant Kamikaze''' at Bright Lights Film Journal.

1943 films
Japanese black-and-white films
1940s Japanese-language films
Japanese martial arts films
Films directed by Akira Kurosawa
Toho films
Films with screenplays by Akira Kurosawa
Japanese action films
1940s action films
Films based on Japanese novels
1943 directorial debut films
Censored films
Judo films